This was West Ham's fifth season in the First Division since their return in season 1957-58. The club were managed by Ron Greenwood and the team captain was Bobby Moore.

Season summary
The season started badly for West Ham and it was not until their sixth game that they managed to win. By the end of 1962 they were in 11th place. Their season was greatly affected by the bad winter of 1962-63 when no games were played at all between 29 December 1962 and 4 February 1963. They finished in 12th place. Geoff Hurst was the top scorer with 15 goals in all competitions and 13 in the league. The next highest scorer was Johnny Byrne with 14. Bobby Moore and Ken Brown made the most appearances; 47 in all competitions. West Ham made the sixth round of the FA Cup before being eliminated by Liverpool but only managed to reach the third round of the League Cup before losing to Rotherham United.

The season saw the last West Ham appearance for future club manager John Lyall who had to retire due to injury, John Dick who had been at the club since 1953 and the first season as a regular player and first goals for future World Cup winner, Martin Peters.

First Division

Results
West Ham United's score comes first

Legend

Football League First Division

FA Cup

League Cup

Squad

References

West Ham United F.C. seasons
1962 sports events in London
1963 sports events in London
West Ham United